Mesne (an Anglo-French legal form of the O. Fr. meien, mod. moyen, mean, Med. Lat. medianus, in the middle, cf. English mean), middle or intermediate, an adjective used in several legal phrases.

 A mesne lord is a landlord who has tenants holding under him, while himself holding of a superior lord. Similar ideas are subinfeudation and subcontract. 
 Mesne process was such process as intervened between the beginning and end of a suit.
 Mesne profits are profits derived from land while in wrongful possession, and may be claimed in damages for trespass, either in a separate action or joined with an action for the recovery of the land. The plaintiff must prove that he has re-entered into possession, his title during the period for which he claims, the fact that the defendant has been in possession during that period, and the amount of the mesne profits. The amount recovered as mesne profits need not be limited to the rental value of the land, but may include a sum to cover such items as deterioration or reasonable costs of getting possession.
 Mesne conveyances are transfers of ownership or possession occurring in intermediate positions in the chain of title between the original owner and the current owner.

Placenames
Mesnes Park in Newton-le-Willows, Merseyside

In Greater Manchester, there are several places with "Mesne" in the name
Mesne Lea in Walkden, Salford
Mesnes Park in Wigan
Worsley Mesnes in Pemberton, Metropolitan Borough of Wigan

See also
 Demesne
 Puisne
 Quia Emptores

References

Feudalism